Einar Bruno Larsen (17 November 1939 – 27 July 2021) was a Norwegian footballer and ice hockey player.

He played for the Norwegian national ice hockey team, and  participated at the Winter Olympics in 1964. He was awarded Gullpucken as best Norwegian ice hockey player in 1963. He also represented the Norway national football team on three occasions between 1959 and 1964, scoring one goal. He spent his senior career in Vålerengen.

He died on 27 July 2021.

References

 

1939 births
2021 deaths
Sportspeople from Oslo
Norwegian footballers
Association football forwards
Vålerenga Fotball players
Norway youth international footballers
Norway under-21 international footballers
Norway international footballers
Norwegian ice hockey players
Olympic ice hockey players of Norway
Ice hockey players at the 1964 Winter Olympics
Vålerenga Ishockey players